Gabriel Maura Gamazo, 1st Duke of Maura (Madrid 1879 – Madrid 1963) was a Spanish politician and historian. He was the son of Antonio Maura - who was Prime Minister of Spain on five occasions. Gabriel was active in the Liberal-Conservative Party and served as Labour Minister in the last government cabinet of Alfonso XIII before the dictatorship of Miguel Primo de Rivera. He fled Spain during the Civil War and did not return until 1953. His archives were destroyed in the conflict by the Popular Front.

As a historian Maura Gamazo was known for his chronicle of the Primo de Rivera dictatorship, 'Bosquejo Histórico de la Dictadura' (English: Historical Sketch of the Dictatorship). He was a member of the Royal Spanish Academy and the Real Academia de la Historia.

References

1879 births
1963 deaths
Conservative Party (Spain) politicians
20th-century Spanish historians
Labour ministers of Spain
Historians of the dictatorship of Primo de Rivera
Exiled Spanish politicians
Exiles of the Spanish Civil War in France